During the 2003–04 English football season, Wigan Athletic competed in the Football League First Division.

Season summary
Wigan were playing in Division One for the first time in their history, and after losing their first game many tipped them for a swift departure, but Wigan confounded expectations to go unbeaten for the next 17 games and sat at the top the table by November. A weak finish saw Wigan win only three of their last 10 games to finish seventh in Division One – a last minute goal by West Ham's Brian Deane in the final game of the season saw the Latics drop out of the play-off places in favour of eventual play-off winners Crystal Palace.

Final league table

Results
Wigan Athletic's score comes first

Legend

Football League First Division

FA Cup

League Cup

First-team squad

Left club during season

Reserve squad

Statistics

Starting 11
Considering starts in all competitions
 GK: #1,  John Filan, 47
 RB: #19,  Nicky Eaden, 50
 CB: #4,  Matt Jackson, 26
 CB: #5,  Jason De Vos, 26
 CB: #6,  Ian Breckin, 47
 LB: #26,  Leighton Baines, 25
 CM: #18,  Jason Jarrett, 35
 CM: #21,  Jimmy Bullard, 50
 CM: #10,  Lee McCulloch, 35
 CF: #7,  Andy Liddell, 38
 CF: #9,  Nathan Ellington, 45

References

2003-04
Wigan Athletic